Live in Europe 1967: The Bootleg Series Vol. 1 is a 3 CD + 1 DVD live album of Miles Davis and his "second great quintet" (saxophonist Wayne Shorter, pianist Herbie Hancock, bassist Ron Carter, and drummer Tony Williams).  The CDs contain recordings of three separate concerts in Europe (Antwerp, Copenhagen and Paris), and the DVD has two additional concerts from Karlsruhe and Stockholm.

The first disc was recorded at the Koningin Elizabethzaal in Antwerp, Belgium, on 28 October 1967.  The second disc contains the concert from 2 November 1967 at the Tivoli Gardens in Copenhagen, Denmark plus the beginning of 6 November 1967 at the Salle Pleyel in Paris, France.  The third disc is the majority of the Paris set.  The DVD contains concerts recorded in West Germany on 7 November 1967 and Sweden on 31 October 1967

Reception

Live in Europe 1967: The Bootleg Series Vol. 1 received positive reviews on release. At Metacritic, which assigns a normalised rating out of 100 to reviews from mainstream critics, the album has received a score of 99, based on 7 reviews which is categorised as universal acclaim. Nate Chinen of The New York Times said the album "captures Davis’s finest working band at its apogee, straining at the limits of post-bop refinement." Thom Jurek's review on Allmusic stated "Musically, the quintet -- Davis, Herbie Hancock, Wayne Shorter, Ron Carter, and Tony Williams -- are firing on all cylinders throughout". In his review for Pitchfork, Hank Shteamer observed "it isn't just the best band Miles ever led, but one of the choicest small groups in jazz history... At its heart, jazz thrives on bold, sensitive interaction in the moment, and Live in Europe 1967 represents the pinnacle of that practice.". PopMatters', Matthew Flander gave the album 10 out of 10 saying "no matter how many releases we get from the Davis archives, no matter how familiar you are with his mid-‘60s work, Live in Europe 1967 will surprise you and remind you that, even in lean times, even when the trends of the genre he championed were moving away from him, even when his country stopped caring, Miles Davis found a way to press forward, to reinvent, and to give us yet another classic sound, and perhaps the final thrilling word on Jazz as he knew it"

Track listing
Source

Personnel
Miles Davis – trumpet
Wayne Shorter – tenor saxophone
Herbie Hancock – piano
Ron Carter – bass
Tony Williams – drums

References

2011 live albums
Miles Davis live albums